Congo Bill (1948) is a Columbia movie serial based on the DC Comics character Congo Bill, later named Congorilla.

Plot
A girl is about to inherit a fortune, but she is missing in Africa. Her family engages Congo Bill, an adventurer, to find her, and bring her back to civilization. He follows a legend about a mysterious White Queen, but his path is full of difficulties, by an inhospitable jungle, and the man who will lose the fortune if the girl is found alive...

Cast
 Don McGuire as Congo Bill, famed hunter and animal trainer
 Cleo Moore as Queen Lureen / Ruth Culver, white ruler of a forbidden valley in Africa and the missing heiress to the Culver fortune
 Jack Ingram as Cameron, mysterious trader
 I. Stanford Jolley as Bernie McGraw, villainous trustee of the Culver fortune
 Leonard Penn as Andre Bocar, owner of the seedy African bar The Green Parrot Inn, in Bernie McGraw's pay and working for his own ends
 Nelson Leigh as Dr Greenway
 Charles King as Kleeg, employee of Andre Bocar in The Green Parrot Inn
 Armida Vendrell as Zalea
 Hugh Prosser as Morelli
 Neyle Morrow as Kahla
 Fred Graham as Villabo
 Rusty Wescoatt as Ivan
 Anthony Warde as Rogan
 Stephen Carr as Tom McGraw, murdered brother of Bernie McGraw and trustee of the Culver fortune
 William Fawcett as Blinky
 Knox Manning as Narrator
 Frank O'Connor as Frank, cafe clerk
 Eddie Parker as torturer
 Stanley Price as Nagu's friend

Crew
 Directors: Thomas Carr, Spencer Gordon Bennet
 Producer: Sam Katzman
 Cinematographer: Ira Morgan
 Art Director: Paul Palmentola
 Editors: Earl Turner, Dwight Caldwell
 Sound mixer: Josh Westmoreland

Chapter titles
 The Untamed Beast
 Jungle Gold
 A Hot Reception
 Congo Bill Springs a Trap
 White Shadows in the Jungle
 The White Queen
 Black Panther
 Sinister Schemes
 The Witch Doctor Strikes
 Trail of Treachery
 A Desperate Chance
 The Lair of the Beast
 Menace of the Jungle
 Treasure Trap
 The Missing Letter
Source:

See also
 List of film serials by year
 List of film serials by studio

References

External links
 
 

1948 films
1940s English-language films
1940s superhero films
1948 adventure films
American black-and-white films
Columbia Pictures film serials
Live-action films based on DC Comics
Films directed by Spencer Gordon Bennet
Films directed by Thomas Carr
American adventure films
Films with screenplays by George H. Plympton
1940s American films

Films based on DC Comics